Always Be Together may refer to:

"Always Be Together", a song by Pablo Cruise from Worlds Away, 1978
"Always Be Together", song by Little Mix from DNA, 2012